Charles I. D. Looff was a German master carver and builder of hand-carved carousels and amusement rides, who immigrated to the United States of America in 1870. Looff built the first carousel at Coney Island in 1876. During his lifetime, he built over 40 carousels, several amusements parks, numerous roller coasters and Ferris wheels, and built California's famous Santa Monica Pier. He became famous for creating the unique Coney Island style of carousel carving.

Early years
Charles Looff was born as Carl Jürgen Detlev Looff on May 24, 1852 in Bad Bramstedt, Duchy of Holstein, German Confederation. His father, Jürgen Detlef Christian Looff, was a master blacksmith and wagon builder. Watching his father, Carl learned how to work with metal and wood. To avoid the coming war, Carl emigrated to the United States. Arriving in Castle Garden, New York City, on August 14, 1870, he changed his first name to Charles. In low German, the letters I and J look very much alike, and confusion set in as to his initials. Somehow, his name became Charles I. D. Looff instead of J. D. Looff.

Settling on Leonard Street in Greenpoint, Brooklyn, he found work as a carver at a furniture factory. Working part-time as a ballroom dance instructor, Looff met and married Anna Dolle, also from Germany, in 1874. After working in the furniture factory all day, he took scraps of wood home to his apartment and began carving them into carousel animals. Young Looff assembled his wooden horses and animals onto a circular platform and created his first merry-go-round. In 1876, he installed his ride at Lucy Vandeveer's Bathing Pavilion at West Sixth Street and Surf Avenue. This was Coney Island's first carousel and first amusement ride.

Looff opened a factory at 30 Bedford Avenue in Brooklyn and continued building more carousels. He installed a merry-go-round at a restaurant and beer garden on Surf Avenue, Coney Island owned by Charles Feltman, one of several people credited with inventing the American hot dog. Looff installed another machine at Coney Island and then created a large ride for Asbury Park in New Jersey. Looff began to hire expert carvers such as John Zalar, Marcus Illions, John Mueller and Charles Carmel to help with his expanding business.

Charles and Anna had six children: Anna (1875–1896), Helen (1877–1956), Emma (1879–1938), Charles (1881–1924), William (1883–1945), Arthur (1888–1970). All except Anna, who died at age 21 as a result of a trolley accident, would work with their father in some way in the carousel business. When the City of New York took his property under eminent domain to build a city park, Looff moved his family to Crescent Park, in Riverside, Rhode Island.

Rhode Island years

In 1886, Colonel George Boyden established an amusement park named Crescent Park in Riverside, Rhode Island, on  overlooking Narragansett Bay. Boyden commissioned Charles I. D. Looff to build a large carousel at the head of a  pier that received throngs of people from the steamboats that cruised up and down the bay. Crescent Park became known as "the Coney Island of the East" during this time.

In 1895, Looff built a larger and more elaborate carousel overlooking the midway. This beautiful ride contains 61 horses, 1 camel, 2 single chariots, and 2 double chariots. He used this ride as a showpiece for prospective buyers to choose the types of carved horses for their machines. Looff built his workshop adjoining the carousel. Here he would produce many merry-go-rounds for amusement parks in New England and across the United States. Looff's daughter, Helen, and her husband Charles Simmons bought the ride from Looff's widow's estate in 1930. This carousel, now owned by the city of East Providence, Rhode Island, has been fully restored, is still operating in its original location and was placed on the National Register of Historic Places in 1976. In 1985, the Rhode Island General Assembly proclaimed the carousel as the "State Jewel of American Folk Art". In 1987, the National Park Service designated the carousel as a National Historic Landmark.

Charles Looff's son, Charles Jr., worked in the shop carving saddles and chariots for his father. In 1920, young Charles purchased Crescent Park and operated it until his death in 1925 at age 44. Charles Jr. built an excursion boat, which he named the Miss Looff in honor of his sister, Anna, which cruised the waters of Narragansett Bay, bringing customers from Providence and Newport, Rhode Island, to Crescent Park. Charles Jr. married Emma Simmons, the sister of Charles Simmons, who had married Helen Looff.

In the early 1900s, Looff built carousels and figure-8 roller coasters for the Texas and Oklahoma state fairs.

In 1909, Charles I. D. Looff built a beautiful carousel with 54 horses and presented it to his daughter, Emma, as a wedding present, when she married Louis Vogel. The ride was installed at Natatorium Park in Spokane, Washington. This ride has been restored and operates today at Riverfront Park in Spokane.

California years
Charles I. D., meanwhile, had become enchanted with the possibilities for amusement parks on the West Coast and in August 1910 moved to California, leaving his daughter Helen Looff and her husband Charles Simmons, son Charles Looff Jr. and his wife Emma Simmons Looff to manage the family properties in Rhode Island. Charles I. D. Looff settled in Long Beach and built a factory on West Sixth Street. He purchased property at The Pike, an amusement area on Long Beach's waterfront, and built a magnificent merry-go-round there. The family lived in an apartment above the ride. Son, Arthur, also operated Lite-a-Line, a type of Fascination (game) at the Pike that is still in operation today at 2500 Long Beach Boulevard in Long Beach. It was subsequently moved in the early part of the 21st century. It also houses a small but very detailed and vivid museum in honor of his carvings and ride technology but most specifically Looff's Long Beach Pike enterprise. In 1943, fire destroyed the Pike carousel. Son Arthur replaced it with another Looff merry-go-round.

In 1916, Looff with his son, Arthur, designed and built Looff's Santa Monica Pier along the south side of the city's long, narrow, municipal pier. They constructed a large Byzantine-Moorish style "Hippodrome" building to house one of their ornate carousels, now known as the Santa Monica Looff Hippodrome. The Looffs also erected the Blue Streak Racer wooden roller coaster on their new pleasure pier, along with The Whip and the Aeroscope thrill ride.

In addition to Santa Monica and the Pike, Looff built and operated amusement parks and carousels at Ocean Park, Redondo Beach, Venice Beach, and Santa Cruz, as well as Griffith Park in Los Angeles (still in operation) which coincidentally is the carousel that helped inspire Walt Disney to design and eventually build Disneyland and Disney World. Disneyland Resorts has on display the actual park bench that Disney sat on as he watched his daughters ride the merry-go-round and day-dreamed about a new type of totally immersive theme park experience. There has also been a Looff carousel horse added to the exhibit at the entrance to the "Moments with Lincoln" attraction at Disneyland in Anaheim. Looff built a short-lived amusement park in Seattle called Luna Park. The carousel at Luna Park had been planned for San Francisco, but the infamous earthquake prompted Looff to create Luna Park in Seattle instead. Today that carousel has returned to San Francisco and is thrilling new generations of children.

Charles I. D. Looff died on July 1, 1918, in Long Beach, California. After his death, his son Arthur continued to manage the family's West Coast operation, including building the Giant Dipper roller coaster at the Santa Cruz Beach Boardwalk.

The Santa Monica Looff Hippodrome and the Santa Cruz Looff Carousel and Roller Coaster were both designated National Historic Landmarks in 1987.

Looff carousels

References

A Pictorial History of the Carousel by Frederick Fried - 1964
Painted Ponies by William Manns, Peggy Shank, Marianne Stevens - 1986
Carousel Art - A magazine for people who love merry-go-rounds-PO Box 667, Garden Grove, California 92642
Art of the Carousel by Charlotte Dinger - 1984
A History of the American Amusement Industry by William F. Mangels
The Carousel Keepers, An Oral History of American Carousels by Carrie Papa - 1998
Rhode Island Amusement Parks by Rob Lewis and Ryan Young - 1998
A Century of Fun-A Pictorial History of New england Amusement Parks by Bob Goldsack -1993
Dear Old Nat...Spokane's Playground by Nostalgia Magazine - 2003
Early American Wood Carving by Erwin O. Christensen - 1952
Lincoln Park Remembered 1894-1987 edited by Thomas, McCabe and Furtado - 1999
Coney Island: The People's Playground by Michael Immerso - 2002
Fairground Art by Geoff Weedon - 2003
History of Revere Beach Peter McCauley, City Hall, Revere, Mass. - 1980
The Great American Carousel by Tobin Fraley - 1994

1852 births
1918 deaths
People from Bad Bramstedt
People from the Duchy of Holstein
German emigrants to the United States
American woodcarvers
Amusement ride manufacturers
Carousel designers
People from Greenpoint, Brooklyn
Carousel manufacturers